In aerodynamics, the Prandtl–Meyer function describes the angle through which a flow turns isentropically from sonic velocity (M=1) to a Mach (M) number greater than 1. The maximum angle through which a sonic (M = 1) flow can be turned around a convex corner is calculated for M = . For an ideal gas, it is expressed as follows,

 

By convention, the constant of integration is selected such that 

 

where,  is the absolute value of the angle through which the flow turns,  is the flow Mach number and the suffixes "1" and "2" denote the initial and final conditions respectively.

See also 
 Gas dynamics
 Prandtl–Meyer expansion fan

References 
 

Aerodynamics
Fluid dynamics